Pradhan Mantri Krishi Sinchai Yojana is a national mission to improve farm productivity and ensure better utilization of the resources in the country. The decision was taken on 1 July 2015 at the meeting of Cabinet Committee on Economic Affairs, approved with an outlay of 50000 crore for period of 5 years (2015-16 to 2019-20).

Major objectives 

 Convergence of investment in irrigation at the field level
 Expand cultivable area under irrigation (हर खेत को पानी)
 Improve On-farm water use efficiency to reduce wastage of water
 Enhance the adoption of being precise in irrigation and other water saving technologies (more crop per drop)

Purpose
The primary objectives of PMKSY are to attract investments in irrigation system at field level, develop and expand cultivable land in the country, enhance ranch water use in order to minimize wastage of water, enhance crop per drop by implementing water-saving technologies and precision irrigation. The plan additionally calls for bringing ministries, offices, organizations, research and financial institutions occupied with creation and recycling of water under one platform so that an exhaustive and holistic outlook of the whole water cycle is considered. The goal is to open the doors for optimal water budgeting in all sectors. Tagline for PMKSY is "more crop per drop".

The Integrated Watershed Management programme was subsumed into the current PMKSY on 26 October 2015. The core implementation activities of IWMP were unchanged and were as per the Common Guidelines 2008 (Revised 2011) of IWMP. Convergence with other Central and State Government schemes, remains the top of the agenda for the programme towards optimal and judicious utilization of financial resources. Action has also been taken to undertake Natural Resources Management activities by utilizing labour component of MGNREGS and to undertake some of the Entry Point Activities in convergence with Swachh Bharat Mission (Gramin).

Other agriculture schemes launched by Modi regime 

Agriculture initiatives schemes launched by the Narendra Modi regime are:

 2020 Indian agriculture acts
 Atal Bhujal Yojana
 E-NAM for online agrimarketing
 Gramin Bhandaran Yojana for local storage
 Micro Irrigation Fund (MIF)
 National Mission For Sustainable Agriculture (NMSA)
 National Scheme on Fisheries Training and Extension
 National Scheme on Welfare of Fishermen
 Pradhan Mantri Kisan Samman Nidhi (PMKSN) for minimum support scheme
 Pradhan Mantri Krishi Sinchai Yojana (PMKSY), for irrigation
 Paramparagat Krishi Vikas Yojana (PKVY) for organic farming
 Pradhan Mantri Fasal Bima Yojana (PMFBY) for crop insurance

See also

 Agriculture in India
 Agricultural insurance in India
 Irrigation in India
 Rashtriya Krishi Vikas Yojana

References

Modi administration initiatives
Irrigation in India
Government schemes in India